Sir Christopher Munro Clark  (born 14 March 1960) is an Australian historian living in the United Kingdom and Germany. He is the twenty-second Regius Professor of History at the University of Cambridge. In 2015, he was knighted for his services to Anglo-German relations.

Education and academic positions
Clark was educated at Sydney Grammar School from 1972 to 1978, the University of Sydney (where he studied history) and the Freie Universität Berlin from 1985 to 1987.

Clark received his PhD at the University of Cambridge, having been a member of Pembroke College from 1987 to 1991. He is Professor in Modern European History at the University of Cambridge and, since 1991, has been a fellow of St Catharine's College, where he is currently Director of Studies in History. In 2003, Clark was appointed University Lecturer in Modern European History and, in 2006, Reader in Modern European History. His Cambridge University professorship in history followed in 2008. In September 2014 he succeeded Richard J. Evans as Regius Professor of History at Cambridge. In the birthday honours of June 2015, Clark was knighted on the recommendation of the foreign secretary for his services to Anglo-German relations.

Professional career
As he acknowledges in the foreword to Iron Kingdom, living in West Berlin from 1985 to 1987, during what turned out to be the last years of the divided Germany, gave him an insight into German history and society.

Earlier work
Clark's academic focus started with the history of Prussia, with his earlier researches concentrating on Pietism and on Judaism in Prussia as well as the power struggle, known as the Kulturkampf, between Bismarck's Prussian state and the Catholic Church. His scope has since broadened to embrace more generally the competitive relationships between religious institutions and the state in modern Europe. He is the author of a study of Christian–Jewish relations in Prussia (The Politics of Conversion. Missionary Protestantism and the Jews in Prussia, 1728–1941; Oxford: Oxford University Press, 1995).

Iron Kingdom: The Rise and Downfall of Prussia, 1600–1947
Clark's best-selling history of Prussia (Iron Kingdom: The Rise and Downfall of Prussia, 1600–1947; London: Penguin, 2006) won several prizes. Its critical reception gave him a public profile that reached beyond the academic world. The German-language version of the book, Preußen. Aufstieg und Niedergang 1600–1947, won Clark the 2010 , an award normally given to historians nearing the end of their careers. Clark remains (in 2014) the youngest-ever recipient of the triennial prize and the only winner not to have approached his work as a mother-tongue German-speaker. 

In 17 chapters covering 800 pages, Clark contends that Germany was "not the fulfillment of Prussia's destiny but its downfall". Although the 19th-century Kulturkampf was characterised by a peculiar intensity and radicalism, Clark's careful study of sources in several different European languages enabled him to spell out just how closely the Prussian experience of church-state rivalry resembled events elsewhere in Europe. In that way, the book powerfully rebuts the traditional Sonderweg bandwagon by which throughout the 20th century, mainstream historians placed great emphasis on the "differentness" of Germany's historical path before and during the 19th century. Clark downplays the perceived uniqueness of the much-vaunted reform agenda, which was pursued by Prussia between 1815 and 1848, and believes that the political and economic significance of the German customs union, established in 1834, came to be discovered and then overstated by historians only retrospectively and in the light of much-later political developments.

Kaiser Wilhelm II
With his critical biography of the last German Kaiser (Kaiser Wilhelm II; Harlow: Longman, 2000, series "Profiles in Power"), Clark aims to offer correctives to many of the traditional positions presented in J. C. G. Röhl's three-volume biography of Wilhelm.

The Sleepwalkers: How Europe Went to War in 1914
Clark's study of the outbreak of the First World War, The Sleepwalkers: How Europe Went to War in 1914, appeared in English in 2012; the German version (Die Schlafwandler: Wie Europa in den Ersten Weltkrieg zog) followed in 2013. The book challenges the imputation, which had been widely accepted by mainstream scholars since 1919, of a peculiar "war guilt" attaching to the German Empire. He instead maps carefully the complex mechanism of events and misjudgements that led to war. There was in 1914 nothing inevitable about the war. Risks inherent in the strategies pursued by the various governments involved had been taken before without catastrophic consequences, which now enabled leaders to follow similar approaches without adequately evaluating or recognising those risks. Among international experts, many saw the presentation by Clark of his research and insights as groundbreaking.

In Germany itself, where the book received much critical attention, not all reactions were positive. Volker Ullrich contended that Clark's analysis largely disregards the pressure for war coming from Germany's powerful military establishment. According to Hans-Ulrich Wehler, Clark had diligently researched the sources covering the war's causes from the German side only to "eliminate [many of them] with bewildering one-sidedness" ("verblüffend einseitig eliminiert"). Wehler attributed the sales success of the book in Germany to a "deep-seated need [on the part of German readers], no longer so constrained by the taboos characteristic of the later twentieth century, to free themselves from the burdensome allegations of national war guilt". However, Clark observes that the current German debate about the start of the war is obfuscated by its link to their moral repugnance at the Nazi era.

Other work

Clark is also the co-editor with Wolfram Kaiser of a transnational study of secular-clerical conflict in 19th-century Europe (Culture Wars. Catholic-Secular Conflict in Nineteenth-Century Europe, Cambridge: Cambridge University Press, 2003), and the author of numerous articles and essays. Professor Clark presented the BBC Four documentary programme "Frederick the Great and the Enigma of Prussia". He also presented and narrated the 2017 ZDFE documentary "The Story of Europe".

Since 1998, Clark has been a series-editor of the scholarly book series New Studies in European History from Cambridge University Press. He is a Fellow of the Australian Academy of the Humanities and a prominent member of the Mannheim based  ("Prussian History Working Group"). In 2010, Clark was elected a member of the British Academy.

Controversy and criticism

In 2019, Clark was embroiled in controversy surrounding his 2011 report, commissioned by the head of the Hohenzollern family, Georg Friedrich, Prince of Prussia, on the Hohenzollern family's relations with the Nazis. The report was in support of the family's claims for compensation under a 1994 German law allowing restitution for the loss of property confiscated by the German Democratic Republic if the claimants or their ancestors had not "given substantial support" to the National Socialist or the East German Communist regimes. Clark acknowledged that expressions of support for the Nazis had been made by the last Kaiser's eldest son, Wilhelm, the most senior member of the former dynasty in Germany in the 1920s and the 1930s and the owner of the Hohenzollern properties. However, his report concluded that Wilhelm was "one of the politically most reserved and least compromised persons" of the aristocratic Nazi collaborators and that he was simply too marginal a figure to have been able to give "significant support" to Hitler, a position that supported the Hohenzollerns' claims. 

Brandt and Malinowski provided substantial further evidence of Wilhelm's support for the Nazis that Clark had overlooked. Their two reports leave no doubt about the prince's deep-seated anti-Semitism.

During the historical controversy that unfolded in the German press, Richard J. Evans, Clark's predecessor as Regius Professor of History (Cambridge), criticised his colleague for not reflecting more carefully before accepting offers to produce expert reports.

In 2020, however, Clark claimed to have changed his view and more or less agreed with Malinowski.

Personal life
Clark and his wife, have two sons.

Awards and decorations
2007 Wolfson History Prize awarded for Iron Kingdom: The Rise and Downfall of Prussia, 1600–1947
2007 H-Soz-u-Kult prize "Das historische Buch"
2007 Queensland Premier's Literary Awards, History Book Award for Iron Kingdom: The Rise and Downfall of Prussia, 1600–1947
2007 General History Prize, New South Wales Premier's History Awards, for Iron Kingdom: The Rise and Downfall of Prussia, 1600–1947
2010
In October 2010, Germany awarded Clark the Officer's Cross of the Order of Merit of the Federal Republic of Germany as his "research had contributed greatly to German-British relations". The honour was conferred by the German ambassador  during a reception at his official London residence.
Another German award was bestowed on Clark for his book Preußen: Aufstieg und Niedergang 1600–1947 by German President Christian Wulff in November 2010. Chris Clark was the first foreigner to be awarded the German Historians' Prize [Deutscher Historikerpreis].
2013 Cundill Prize, finalist, for The Sleepwalkers: How Europe Went To War In 1914
2013 Los Angeles Times Book Prize (History), winner for The Sleepwalkers
2013 Hessell-Tiltman Prize, shortlist for The Sleepwalkers
2015 Laura Shannon Prize, for The Sleepwalkers
2015 Knight Bachelor
2018 European Prize for Political Culture
2019 Pour le Mérite for Sciences and Arts

Publications

Books written
 

 Published in Germany as Preußen: Aufstieg und Niedergang 1600–1947 by DVA, 2007

Books edited

Articles
 Christopher Clark, "'This Is a Reality, Not a Threat'" (review of Lawrence Freedman, The Future of War: A History and Robert H. Latiff, Future War: Preparing for the New Global Battlefield), The New York Review of Books, vol. LXV, no. 18 (22 November 2018), pp. 53–54.

Films

References
Notes

Further reading
"Germany's ex-royals want their riches back, but past ties to Hitler stand in the way" by Scott McLean and Nadine Schmidt, CNN, 26 September 2020

External links

 Profile, University of Cambridge

Living people
1960 births
Fellows of St Catharine's College, Cambridge
Officers Crosses of the Order of Merit of the Federal Republic of Germany
Recipients of the Pour le Mérite (civil class)
Free University of Berlin alumni
University of Sydney alumni
Alumni of Pembroke College, Cambridge
Australian expatriates in the United Kingdom
Australian Knights Bachelor
Expatriate academics in the United Kingdom
Members of the University of Cambridge faculty of history
21st-century Australian historians
20th-century Australian historians
Historians of Germany
Australian historians of religion
Historians of World War I
Australian biographers
Male biographers
21st-century biographers
20th-century biographers
Fellows of the British Academy
20th-century Australian male writers
Regius Professors of History (Cambridge)